Erik Morales vs. Marcos Maidana, billed as Action Heroes, was a boxing light welterweight fight for the Interim WBA Light Welterweight championship. The bout took place on April 9 at MGM Grand Garden Arena in Las Vegas, Nevada, United States.

Morales, a Mexican legend and a five time world champion at three different weight classes, made his mark in the Junior Welterweight division by obtaining the WBC Silver light welterweight title in September 2010 and defending it in December of the same year. Following his last bout, he expressed his desire to fight Juan Manuel Marquez, however Marquez turned this fight down and then the matchup was made with Maidana through Golden Boy Promotions.

Maidana was coming from a twelve-round decision loss against then title-holder Amir Khan in December 2010, his second shot at a world title. This was his chance to start back on the road to another full title shot.

Background

Erik Morales 
Morales officially ended his retirement on March 27, 2010 by returning and defeating José Alfaro. Morales' precision and stamina overcame Alfaro; easily defeating him via unanimous decision.  In his second fight after returning to the ring Erik Morales fought Willie Limond. Limond started strong in the first three rounds being very quick, elusive, and staying away from Morales' reach. Morales threw body shots to slow his opponent down and fought very conservative until Limond started getting tired. The fight was stopped as Limond could not carry on and won the WBC Silver World Light Welterweight title. He then defended his title against tough challenger Francisco Lorenzo and won by unanimous decision.

Marcos Maidana 
In his first shot at a major world title, Maidana lost via points decision to the rugged Andriy Kotelnik somewhat controversially, a result that had a lot of observers questioning the judges. After that he went on to win the WBA Interim belt by stopping prospect Victor Ortiz, both of them exchanging knockdowns.
He made three successful defenses before challenging reigning champion Amir Khan, 2 of which were by knockouts. In an anticipated match between two exciting junior-welterweights there was bound to be fireworks. Khan defeated Maidana by unanimous decision, and the championship fight received a lot of recognition as 2010's Fight of the Year.

Undercard

Televised 
 Lightweight bout:  Robert Guerrero vs.  Michael Katsidis
Guerrero defeated Katsidis via unanimous decision. (117-108, 118-106, 118-107)
 Welterweight bout:  Paul Malignaggi vs.  Jose Miguel Cotto
Malignaggi defeated Cotto via unanimous decision. (99-91, 97-93, 99-91)
 Light Middleweight bout:  James Kirkland vs.  Nobuhiro Ishida
Ishida defeated Kirkland via technical knockout. The fight was stopped at 1:53 of round one.

Preliminary card
 Light Welterweight bout:  Danny Garcia vs.  Nate Campbell
Garcia defeated Campbell via unanimous decision. (99-91, 98-92, 100-90)
 Light Middleweight bout:  Mikaël Zewski vs.  Clint Coronel
Zewski defeated Coronel via split decision. (60-54, 60-54 ,59-55)
 Cruiserweight bout:  Rakhim Chakhkiev vs.  Harvey Jolly
Chakhkiev defeated Jolly via technical knockout in the third round.

Fight earnings
Erik Morales $250,000  vs. Marcos Maidana  $500,000

The Fight
In the first round, Maidana came out with ferocity as expected and proceeded to batter his older opponent around the ring. He landed multiple power punches, including an uppercut that opened a huge swelling over Morales' left eye which worsened over the course of the fight, and when the Mexican walked back to his corner having taken a large amount of punishment in the opening three minutes most observers felt their predictions were being fulfilled. The one-sided nature of the bout continued for the next couple of rounds, but then at the end of the third round Morales begin to fight back and landed a hard combination to the head of Maidana and the tide began to turn.

From the fourth round onwards and although he was effectively fighting with one eye, Morales gave as good as he got and was landing the cleaner more effective shots, albeit occasionally being swarmed by the sheer number of punches being landed in return by the relentless Maidana. The fight became a see-saw affair and then, in the eighth round, Morales hit Maidana with a huge left hook that almost stopped the Argentinian. The next couple of rounds continued in this fashion, with Maidana using his strength and stamina to bully Morales and the Mexican using his sharper punching and ring intelligence to land effective counters and combinations. The fight was fast turning into a modern classic.

In the "championship rounds" (the eleventh and twelfth), Morales seemed to tire and Maidana took advantage, overwhelming him with his strength and punishing the ageing warrior continually to the head and body. Maidana finished the fight much the stronger of the two and his late surge gave him the win on the scorecards, 116-112 twice with the third judge scoring the fight a draw, 114-114.

With this victory, Maidana put himself firmly back in the title picture, being awarded the interim WBA championship and putting himself back up with the division's elite in Khan and Timothy Bradley. The true glory on the night however went to Morales, who turned back the clock with an outstanding performance against the odds and against a host of seeming disadvantages, and possibly winning the fight in the eyes of some observers. Morales asked for a rematch in the near future and Maidana also seemed keen in the post-fight interviews, possibly for July 30 if the matchup can be arranged. No-one will be complaining if the rematch were to take place and it was anywhere near as good as their first meeting.

References

External links
Home Page
HBO

Boxing matches
2011 in boxing
Boxing in Las Vegas
2011 in sports in Nevada
Boxing on HBO
Golden Boy Promotions
April 2011 sports events in the United States
MGM Grand Garden Arena